Valeriu Călinoiu (9 October 1928 – 20 December 1990) was a Romanian footballer. He competed in the men's tournament at the 1952 Summer Olympics.

Club career
Valeriu Călinoiu was born on 9 October 1928 in Bucharest, Romania and he started playing junior level football in 1942 at Olympia București, after one year moving at Carmen București and started his senior career in 1948 at IMS Hunedoara. He made his Divizia A debut, playing for Petrolul București on 29 May 1949 in a 2–0 away victory against CFR Cluj. After a short period spent in Divizia B at Dinamo Brașov which he helped promote to the first league, he went to play at Dinamo București in 1951 where he spent 9 seasons, in the 1955 Divizia A season helping the club win the first Divizia A title in its history, being used by coach Angelo Niculescu in 22 matches in which he scored one goal. He also won the 1958–59 Cupa României and played in the first European match of a Romanian team in the 1956–57 European Cup in the 3–1 victory against Galatasaray in which he was also the team's captain, helping The Red Dogs go to the next phase of the competition where they were eliminated by CDNA Sofia, Călinoiu playing in all four games from the campaign. On 19 June 1960, Călinoiu played his last Divizia A match for Dinamo in a 3–1 away loss against Farul Constanța, having a total of 167 matches in which he scored 9 goals in the competition. Valeriu Călinoiu died on 20 December 1990 at age 62.

International career
Valeriu Călinoiu played 20 games and scored one goal at international level for Romania, making his debut under coach Gheorghe Popescu I in a 2–1 loss against Hungary at the 1952 Summer Olympics. He played four games in which he scored one goal in a 2–1 away victory against Bulgaria at the 1954 World Cup qualifiers. His last four games played for the national team were at the 1958 World Cup qualifiers, his last appearance taking place on 17 November 1957 in a 2–0 away loss against Yugoslavia.

International goals
Scores and results list Romania's goal tally first, score column indicates score after each Călinoiu goal.

Managerial career
Valeriu Călinoiu had only one spell as a coach from 1961 until 1963 at Divizia B team, Știința Craiova where he gave Ion Oblemenco his debut in senior football.

Honours
Dinamo Brașov
Divizia B: 1950
Dinamo București
Divizia A: 1955
Cupa României: 1958–59

Notes

References

External links

1928 births
1990 deaths
Romanian footballers
Romania international footballers
Olympic footballers of Romania
Footballers at the 1952 Summer Olympics
FC Carmen București players
CS Corvinul Hunedoara players
FC Petrolul Ploiești players
Unirea Tricolor București players
FC Dinamo București players
Liga I players
Liga II players
Romanian football managers
CS Universitatea Craiova managers
Footballers from Bucharest
Association football midfielders